Sabyrovo (Habır) is a rural locality (a selo) and the administrative centre of Sabyrovsky Selsoviet, Zilairsky District, Bashkortostan, Russia. The population was 527 as of 2010. There are 8 streets.

Geography 
Sabyrovo is located 40 km southeast of Zilair (the district's administrative centre) by road. Salyakhovo is the nearest rural locality.

References 

Rural localities in Zilairsky District